Eyn-e Haddad (also Romanized as ‘Eyn-e Ḩaddād and ‘Eyn Ḩaddād) is a village in Howmeh-ye Gharbi Rural District, in the Central District of Ramhormoz County, Khuzestan Province, Iran. At the 2006 census, its population was 187, in 28 families.

References 

Populated places in Ramhormoz County